Joseph Gape (1720–1801) was an English barrister and three-times mayor of St Albans in Hertfordshire in 1746, 1761 and 1797. He also served on the city council for more than 50 years.

In 2014, a painting of Gape, for which the artist was unknown, was attributed to Thomas Gainsborough by Hugh Belsey on the BBC television series Fake or Fortune?

References

External links
 

1720 births
1801 deaths
Mayors of St Albans
English barristers
Thomas Gainsborough
Fake or Fortune?